Harry Kuhl (7 March 1903 – 11 January 1967) was an Australian rules footballer who played with Port Adelaide in the South Australian National Football League (SANFL) and St Kilda in the Victorian Football League (VFL).

Sources

 Holmesby, Russell & Main, Jim (2007). The Encyclopedia of AFL Footballers. 7th ed. Melbourne: Bas Publishing.

External links

1903 births
1967 deaths
Australian rules footballers from Victoria (Australia)
St Kilda Football Club players
Dimboola Football Club players